Le pillole di Ercole is a 1960 Italian comedy film directed by Luciano Salce. It was shown as part of a retrospective on Italian comedy at the 67th Venice International Film Festival.

Cast
 Nino Manfredi as Dottor Pasqui
 Sylva Koscina as Silvia, Pasqui's wife
 Jeanne Valérie as Odette
 Vittorio De Sica as Piero Cuocolo
 Francis Blanche
 Piera Arico
 Nedo Azzini
 Gianni Bonagura
 Franco Bruno
 Maria Elisabetta Franco
 Annie Gorassini
 Mitchell Kowal
 Ignazio Leone
 Oreste Lionello as Gino
 Lina Tartara Minora (as Lina Minora)
 Andreina Pagnani as Giovanna

Censorship 
When Le pillole di Ercole was first released in Italy in 1960 the Committee for the Theatrical Review of the Italian Ministry of Cultural Heritage and Activities rated it as VM16: not suitable for children under 16. In addition, the committee imposed the modification of the following scenes: 1) the scene in which Manfredi and Koscina hug each other on the bed will be shortened; 2) the scene in which Manfredi makes a house call to Valerie (reel 4); 3) the lines in which De Sica says "...I know, when I am with a woman..." until "...a hay barn" must be deleted. Document N° 32710 signed on 3 September 1960  by Minister Renzo Helfer.

References

External links

1960 films
1960 comedy films
Italian comedy films
1960s Italian-language films
Italian black-and-white films
Films scored by Armando Trovajoli
Films directed by Luciano Salce
Italian films based on plays
1960s Italian films